The 2014 United States Senate election in Oklahoma took place on November 4, 2014 to elect a member of the United States Senate to represent the State of Oklahoma, concurrently with the special election to Oklahoma's other Senate seat, as well as other elections to the United States Senate in other states and elections to the United States House of Representatives and various state and local elections.

Incumbent Republican Senator Jim Inhofe was running for re-election to a fourth term in office. He won the Republican primary against several minor candidates; Democratic nominee Matt Silverstein, an insurance agency owner, was unopposed for his party's nomination. This was Inhofe's first election in which he won every county, and his only election in which he won majority in every county.

Republican primary

Candidates

Declared 
 Jim Inhofe, incumbent U.S. Senator
 D. Jean McBride-Samuels
 Rob Moye, retired air traffic controller
 Evelyn Rogers, perennial candidate
 Erick Wyatt, Iraq War Veteran

Endorsements

Results

Democratic primary

Candidates

Declared 
 Matt Silverstein, insurance agency owner

Endorsements 

Silverstein was unopposed for the Democratic nomination, so no primary was held.

Independents

Candidates

Declared 
 Aaron DeLozier
 Joan Farr
 Ray Woods

General election

Predictions

Polling

Results

See also 

 2014 United States Senate elections
 2014 United States elections
 2014 United States Senate special election in Oklahoma
 2014 United States House of Representatives elections in Oklahoma
 2014 Oklahoma gubernatorial election

References

External links 
 U.S. Senate elections in Oklahoma, 2014 at Ballotpedia
 Campaign contributions at OpenSecrets

Official campaign websites
 Jim Inhofe for Senate incumbent
 Joan Farr for Senate
 D. Jean McBride-Samuels for Senate
 Evelyn Rogers for Senate
 Matt Silverstein for Senate
 Erick Wyatt for Senate

2014
Oklahoma
United States Senate